Franklin Avenue Station can refer to:

Franklin Avenue station (Fulton Street) a station complex in Brooklyn, New York City consisting of:
Franklin Avenue station (IND Fulton Street Line); served by the  trains
Franklin Avenue station (BMT Franklin Avenue Line); served by the  train
Franklin Avenue/Botanic Garden station a station complex in Brooklyn, New York City consisting of:
Franklin Avenue–Medgar Evers College station; served by the  trains
Botanic Garden station; served by the  train
Franklin Avenue station (BMT Lexington Avenue Line), a demolished station in Brooklyn, New York City
Franklin Avenue station (BMT Myrtle Avenue Line), a demolished station in Brooklyn, New York City
Franklin Avenue station (Metro Transit) in Minneapolis, Minnesota